The Yolk's on You is a 1980 non-theatrical Easter special and Looney Tunes animated cartoon short film starring Daffy Duck, Sylvester J. Cat, and Foghorn Leghorn. It is part of the special Daffy Duck's Easter Egg-citement and is a rare example of Foghorn Leghorn, Sylvester, and Daffy appearing together.

Plot
Miss Prissy is as usual late for Foghorn Leghorn's egg expectation. Leghorn is disappointed in Miss Prissy for being late and not laying a normal round white egg. Leghorn warns Prissy only one last chance that if she doesn't lay a normal egg, she will be sent to the old hens farm. Foghorn Leghorn decides that Miss Prissy lays the turquoise Easter eggs. He also tells her to think "egg-shape".

Prissy tries but she lays a golden egg instead. She rolls away the golden egg and soon Sylvester and Daffy find it. The two both try to get it for themselves including the ancient Chinese tickle torture; Daffy whispers to Sylvester to get the egg for one last chance but at the end they accidentally put the disguised golden egg on the fresh egg farms with Miss Prissy. However, they watch as an egg truck takes away the eggs. In the end, Daffy and Sylvester end up breaking all the eggs over an enormous skillet-with Sylvester warning Daffy if they dont find the egg Daffy will end up eating the biggest omelette in history.

This episode was Foghorn's Leghorn's first appearance since the Bugs Bunny cartoon "False Hare" (1964), sixteen years earlier. This cartoon currently airs on the Boomerang channel.

Voices

Mel Blanc as Daffy Duck, Sylvester Cat, and Foghorn Leghorn

Nancy Wible as Miss Prissy

References

External links

Looney Tunes shorts
1980 films
1980 animated films
1980 short films
Films directed by Arthur Davis
Daffy Duck films
1980s American animated films
1980s Warner Bros. animated short films